The 26th Vehbi Emre Tournament 2008, was a wrestling event held in Istanbul, Turkey between 26 and 27 January 2008.

This international tournament includes competition men's Greco-Roman wrestling. This ranking tournament was held in honor of Turkish Wrestler and manager Vehbi Emre.

Medal table

Men's Greco-Roman

Participating nations

References 

Vehbi Emre
Sports competitions in Istanbul
Vehbi Emre
International wrestling competitions hosted by Turkey
Vehbi Emre & Hamit Kaplan Tournament